Achille Richard was a French botanist, botanical illustrator and physician (27 April 1794 in Paris – 5 October 1852).

Biography 

Achille was the son of the botanist Louis-Claude Marie Richard (1754–1821). He was a pharmacist in the French navy, and a member of several well-known societies of that time. He became a botanical leader, and his books remain valued for their clarity and precision.

On 24 February 1834 he was made a member of the French Academy of Sciences (Botanical Section). He was also a member of the French National Academy of Medicine. He studied and described several genera of orchids that take his abbreviation in the generic name, among them Ludisia.

Works

 1819 Nouveaux Éléments de Botanique (New Elements of Botany), Paris. (11th Edition, 1876, available online at Gallica)
 1820 Monographie du genre Hydrocotyle de la famille des ombellifères. (Monograph of genus Hydrocotyle of the family Umbelliferae (or Apiaceae) (available online at Gallica)
 1828 Monographie des orchidées des îles de France et de Bourbon (Monograph of orchids of the islands of France and Réunion), 
 1829 Mémoire sur la famille des rubiacées contenant la description générale de cette famille et les caractères des genres qui la composent (Memory on the family Rubiaceae, containing the general description of this family and characters of genera that compose it), (available online at Gallica)
 1834 Essai d'un Flore de la Nouvelle-Zelande, part 1 of Voyage de découvertes de l'Astrolabe
 1839–1843,Voyage en Abyssinie, a natural history 
 1845 Histoire Physique, Politique et Naturelle de L'Ile de Cuba (Ed. Sagra, Ramón de la). Botanique. Plantes Vasculaires. (Physical, Political and Natural History of the island of Cuba, Botany. Vascular plants.) (available online at Gallica)

Notes

References

External links  
 Biodiversity Library.org: Books by Achille Richard

French taxonomists
1794 births
1852 deaths
Botanists with author abbreviations
Botanical illustrators
Members of the French Academy of Sciences
19th-century French botanists